The 154th Georgia General Assembly convened its first session on January 9, 2017, at the Georgia State Capitol in Atlanta.  Its second session was January 8 through March 29, 2018.  The 154th Georgia General Assembly preceded the 153rd of 2015 and 2016, and succeeded by the 155th in 2019 and 2020.

Party composition

Senate

House of Representatives

Officers

Senate

Majority leadership

Minority leadership

House of Representatives

Majority leadership

Minority leadership

Members of the State Senate

The following is a list of members of the Georgia State Senate.

Members of the House of Representatives

References

Georgia (U.S. state) legislative sessions
2017 in Georgia (U.S. state)